The Serras de Sudeste Microregion (Portuguese:  Microrregião das Serras de Sudeste) is a microregion in the southern part of the state of Rio Grande do Sul, Brazil.  It is named after a hill range (a plateau) named Serras de Sudeste, which means Southeastern Mountain Ranges.  The area is 16,512.614 km².

Municipalities 
The microregion consists of the following municipalities:
Amaral Ferrador
Caçapava do Sul
Candiota
Encruzilhada do Sul
Pedras Altas
Pinheiro Machado
Piratini
Santana da Boa Vista

References

Microregions of Rio Grande do Sul